The 2008–09 KFC Twenty20 Big Bash was the 4th season of the official Twenty20 domestic cricket competition in Australia. Six teams representing six states in Australia participated in the competition. The competition began on 26 December 2008 when the Queensland Bulls took on the New South Wales Blues at the Brisbane Cricket Ground (Gabba).

This season comprised 15 regular matches, a preliminary final and a final, the same as was in the 2007–08 season except with the addition of the preliminary final.

Table

Teams received 2 points for a win, 1 for a tie or no result, and 0 for a loss. The teams ranked two and three played each other at the home venue of the team ranked two, for the right to play the first placed team in a final at the venue of  the first placed team.  In the event of several teams finishing with the same number of points, standings were determined by most wins, then most wins among the teams concerned, then net run rate (NRR).

The two teams that made the final have qualified for the 2009 Champions League Twenty20.

Teams

Fixtures

Knockout stage

Preliminary final

Final

Statistics

Highest Team Totals

Most Runs

Highest Scores

Most Wickets

Best Bowling Figures

References

External links
Tournament Page – Cricket Australia
Tournament Page – Cricinfo

KFC Twenty20 Big Bash seasons
KFC Twenty20 Big Bash
KFC